Nydalasjön, previously known as Tavlesjön, is a lake in Umeå, Sweden. Located a few kilometers outside the central city, Nydalasjön is adjacent to the residential areas Mariehem, Nydalahöjd and Tomtebo.

References

External links

 Map of Nydalasjön 
 Nätverket för Nydalas nyttjare 
 Nydalasjön - Kartläggning av tillrinningsområden och närsaltsflöden 

Umeå
Lakes of Västerbotten County